was a Japanese painter, noted for his work in introducing the Avant-garde trend, especially cubism into Japanese yōga (Western-style) painting in the early 20th century.

Biography
Yorozu was born in what is now part of Hanamaki, Iwate Prefecture in the Tōhoku region of northern Japan as the eldest son of a merchant. He developed an interest in painting at an early age, and based on what he read in Oshita Tojiro’s “A Guide to Watercolors”, taught himself to paint watercolors.

In 1903, he traveled to Tokyo with his cousin where he attended the Waseda Junior High School, and briefly studied Zen meditation.  In 1905, he began to attend the meetings of the Hakubakai art circle established by Kuroda Seiki. In 1906, he traveled to the United States as part of a Rinzai Zen mission, but with the intention of enrolling in an art school in San Francisco, but returned to Japan the same year due to the 1906 San Francisco earthquake. In 1907, he was admitted to the Western Art Department of the Tokyo Fine Arts School.

In 1910 he formed the Absinthe Group with his classmates Hirai Tamenari and Yamashita Tetsunosuke. In 1911, Yorozu graduated, with his graduation work, a post-impressionist piece bordering on fauvism titled Nude Beauty, winning considerable critical acclaim. In the same year he participated in the Fyuzankai Exhibition with Saito Yori and Kishida Ryūsei, in which he displayed "Head of a Woman" (also known as "Woman with a Boa"). The society was disbanded the following year.

From 1914-1916 Yorozu returned to Iwate Prefecture to apply himself to his paintings, supported largely by the earnings of his wife. He painted a variety of self-portraits, landscapes and still-life paintings, and experimented with the beginnings of cubism.  At the 4th Nika Exhibition held in 1917, he displayed "Leaning Woman" and "Still-life with a Brush Stand", which provoked wide critical acclaim. During this time he also displayed still-life works at exhibitions held by the Japan Art Academy and the Inten.

In 1919, he moved to Chigasaki, Kanagawa due to health reasons. After displaying four of his works including "Town Looked Down through the Branches" at the 6th Nika Exhibition, he was selected as a member of the Nika Society. However, his "Three Bathers" was rejected for display at the Teiten Exhibition in 1921. Yorozu participated as an invited member of the Shunyokai in 1922, and became a member of the Japan Watercolor Painting Association. In 1923 he established the Enchokai together with Kobayashi Tokusaburo, Maeda Kanji, Hayashi Takeshi and Onchi Kashiro.

Yorozu died at his home in Chigasaki at the age of 41, from tuberculosis. Many of his works are now displayed at the Yorozu Tetsugoro Museum, in his hometown of Hanamaki, Iwate.

Noted Works

, 1912, National Museum of Modern Art, Tokyo, National Important Cultural Property 
, 1912, National Museum of Modern Art, Tokyo, National Important Cultural Property
, 1912–1913, Iwate Prefectural Museum
, 1912–1913, Iwate Prefectural Museum
, 1915, Iwate Prefectural Museum

References
 Keene, Donald. Dawn to the West. Columbia University Press (1998). 
 Mason, Penelope. History of Japanese Art. Prentice Hall (2005). 
 Miyoshi, Masao. Postmodernism and Japan. Duke University Press (1986). 
 Sadao, Tsuneko. Discovering the Arts of Japan: A Historical Overview. Kodansha International (2003). 
 Schaarschmidt-Richter, Irmtraud. Japanese Modern Art. Painting from 1910 to 1970. Edition Stemmle (2000). 
 Volk, Alicia. In Pursuit of Universalism: Yorozu Tetsugoro and Japanese Modern Art. University of California Press (2010). 
 Weisenfeld, Gennifer. MAVO: Japanese Artists and the Avant-Garde, 1905-1931. University of California Press (2001).

External links
Hanamaki City home page
Biography on Iwate Prefectural home page

1885 births
1927 deaths
People from Hanamaki, Iwate
People of Meiji-period Japan
20th-century deaths from tuberculosis
Tuberculosis deaths in Japan
Japanese portrait painters
20th-century Japanese painters